Tania Chavez Moser (born 6 May 1990) is a Bolivian athletics competitor. In 2020, she competed in the women's half marathon at the 2020 World Athletics Half Marathon Championships held in Gdynia, Poland.

In 2019, she competed in the women's 3000 metres steeplechase event at the 2019 Pan American Games held in Lima, Peru.

References

External links 
 

Living people
1990 births
Place of birth missing (living people)
Bolivian female long-distance runners
Bolivian female marathon runners
Bolivian steeplechase runners
Pan American Games competitors for Bolivia
Athletes (track and field) at the 2019 Pan American Games